The Charmed literary franchise is a series of novels and short stories based on the eponymous television show, which aired from 1998 to 2006. The franchise consists of forty-three novels and eleven short stories released in two anthologies, with ten guide books. Scholarly essay collections on the show were also published. The first work in the series, The Power of Three,  published in November 1999, is a novelization of the series pilot "Something Wicca This Way Comes". Writers of the novels had to obtain approval from Paramount Pictures or CBS Consumer Products to ensure that they followed the canon established for the television series. Writers Paul Ruditis and Pat Shand have discussed these regulations, primarily through their official Tumblr accounts.

Between 1999 and 2008, forty-one novels were published by Simon & Schuster and were set roughly during the same period as the events of the television series. A majority of the novels are original stories revolving around the Charmed Ones and their allies. Ten novels are set between the show's first and third season, and feature the Charmed Ones – Prue, Piper, and Phoebe Halliwell – as the most powerful witches of all time. Thirty-one novels are set after Prue's death in "All Hell Breaks Loose", starting with the novelization of the season four premiere "Charmed Again", and include Piper and Phoebe's half-sister Paige Matthews.

Two works, Seasons of the Witch (2003) and The Warren Witches (2005), are anthologies of short stories. Various authors have written works in the series, including Diana G. Gallagher and Paul Ruditis, who also co-authored two guidebooks, The Book of Three in 2004 and 2006. In 2015, HarperCollins acquired the rights to publish a second series of Charmed novels from CBS Consumer Products which owns the rights to the franchise. The first novel in this series, The War on Witches, was published in May 2015, and the continuity of the narrative fits between the events of Charmed: Season 9 (2010–12) and Season 10 (2014–16) in the comic book series.

Continuity between television show and novels 
Writers of all officially licensed Charmed literature must obtain studio approval of the content of the works – originally from Paramount Pictures until CBS Consumer Products acquired the rights to the franchise – in order to adhere to the conventions of the Charmed canon established by the television series. According to Paul Ruditis, authors of Charmed novels and comics must maintain "the rules for playing in that universe" and "the studio still has to approve the direction we take" as writers. Following these regulations, authors are given creative license but strictly "couldn't go and rewrite history, killing off established characters or suddenly creating romantic pairings that we'd never see on the show".

Pat Shand, the writer of Charmed: Season 10, considered the novels and comics officially part of the Charmed canon and continuity. The comics reference the novels; for example, Shand consulted with Ruditis about the character Tyler Michaels in Charmed: Season 10. While Michaels had first appeared in the season four episode "Lost and Bound", Ruditis had also portrayed Tyler in the novel The Brewing Storm (2004), and Shand wanted to avoid inconsistencies or "retreading".

First novel series

Second novel series

Short stories

Guidebooks, academic articles and scholarly essay collections

See also
 Charmed comics
 List of television series made into books

References

External links
 Simonandschuster.co.uk Official website for the novels.

Book series introduced in 1999
Charmed (TV series)
Charmed
Novels based on television series